Princess Konstancja Lubomirska (ca. 1618–1646) was a Polish noble lady.

Lubomirska married Kazimierz Franciszek Czarnkowski on 1 February 1637 in Kraków. She was the mother of Adam Uriel Czarnkowski, grandmother of Zofia Anna Czarnkowska, Great-grandmother of Katarzyna Opalinska and the great-great-grandmother of Maria Leszczyńska.

1610s births
1646 deaths
Konstancja